Attack of the Moors, also known as The Kings of France, is a 1959 Italian adventure film directed by Mario Costa and starring Chelo Alonso, Rik Battaglia and Gérard Landry.

Plot

Cast
 Chelo Alonso as Suleima
 Rik Battaglia as Roland
 Gérard Landry as Gontrano
 Liana Orfei as Jitana
 Livio Lorenzon as Basirocco
 Andrea Scotti as Lanciotto
 Franco Fantasia as Miguel
 Luisella Boni as Annette
 Olga Solbelli as Fazia
 Gino Marturano as Juanito
 Paola Quattrini as Princess Maria
 Carlo Tamberlani as Duke of Chateau Roux
 Cesare Fantoni as Achirro
 Nerio Bernardi as King of France

References

External links

1959 adventure films
Italian adventure films 
Italian swashbuckler films 
Films directed by Mario Costa 
Films based on the Matter of France
1950s Italian films